KDJT-CD (channel 33) is a low-power, Class A television station licensed to both Salinas and Monterey, California, United States, serving the Monterey Bay area as an affiliate of the Spanish-language UniMás network. It is owned by Entravision Communications alongside Monterey-licensed Univision affiliate KSMS-TV (channel 67). KDJT-CD and KSMS-TV share studios on Garden Court south of Monterey Regional Airport in Monterey; through a channel sharing agreement, the two stations transmit using KDJT-CD's spectrum from an antenna atop Fremont Peak.

Subchannel

References

External links
Entravision official site

UniMás network affiliates
DJT-CD
Television channels and stations established in 1989
1989 establishments in California
DJT-CD
Low-power television stations in the United States
Entravision Communications stations